Little Compton may refer to:

Little Compton, Missouri, United States
Little Compton, Rhode Island, United States
Little Compton, Warwickshire, United Kingdom